The Royal Jozini is a private game reserve located in the foothills of the Lubombo Mountains and includes the northern part of Lake Jozini in Eswatini. It is part of the Nsubane-Pongola Transfrontier Conservation and Resource Area established by a Swaziland/South Africa Protocol covering some 14,000 hectares. The estate includes private lodges, a waterfront area including a boating marina, as well as a jetty and slipway.

References

External links 
https://web.archive.org/web/20101230003834/http://royaljozini.net/site/default.asp
http://www.sapropertymonthly.co.uk/news.aspx?ID=452
http://www.peaceparks.org/news.php?mid=761&pid=162
http://www.sntc.org.sz/programs/tfcas.asp

Protected areas of Eswatini